Elliot Richardson is an American music producer, mixer, songwriter, and multi instrumentalist. His productions have gone on to be televised; charted on the top 40 Billboard charts; and have received worldwide radio airplay. His productions have been used and played on, Grey's Anatomy, One Tree Hill, Ghost Whisper, MTV Real World, and other various Television shows. He resides in the greater Nashville area and is continuing his work with nationally known up and coming artists. He has worked with artists ranging from independent to major record label artists.

Richardson's bands
 Page (lead vocals, guitar)
 Driving By Braille (leadd vocals, guitar)
 Midsummer (guitar, keyboards, backing vocals)
 Peoplemover (guitar, backing vocals)
 Venus Infers (guitar, keyboards, backing vocals)
 Phil Joel (guitar, keyboards, backing vocals)
 The Lads (guitar, backing vocals)
 Uovoixn (solo project)

Discography

Melee- (Warner Bros.) Singles and Christmas singles top 40 on Billboard Japan-Producer. Mixer. Engineer.
Limbeck- (doghouse records)Co-producer. Engineer.
Venus Infers- (Buddy Buddy Music Pub., KROQ 106.7, indie 103.1, MTV, O.C. music award winner)Producer. Mixer. Engineer. Mellotron. Percussion.
Honey Pie- (TV publishing) Co-Producer. Mixer. Engineer. Percussion.
Trent Dabbs- (ready set records, One Tree Hill, Grey's Anatomy)co-writer. producer. mixer. engineer.instrumentation.
Shelly Fraley- (One Tree Hill, Grey's Anatomy, Pretty Little Liars) co-writer. producer. mixer. engineer. instrumentation
Davis Fetter- Producer. Mixer. Engineer. Keys. Bass. Percussion. Bgv's
Jessica Frech- Producer. Mixer. Engineer. Guitars. Synths. Rhodes. Piano. Percussion. Bgv's. String Arrangements
Big Bad Wolf-  Producer. Mixer. Engineer.
Starshine- Co-producer. Engineer. guitars.
Topher Daniels- Co-producer. Engineer. Mixer. Mastering. guitars. percussion.
Sacha Sacket- Mixer.
Nathan Roberts- Mixer. Mastering.
Kingston- Mixer.
Fever Fever- Producer. Engineer. Mixer. Keys. Noises. Mastering
Aushua- (KROQ 106.7)Co-Producer. Mixer. Engineer. Keys. Mastering.
Mike Cambell- (Guitar for Tom Petty and the Heartbreakers)- engineer
Brian Ray- ( Guitar for Paul McCartney) engineer.
Fairchild- Engineer.
Suburban Legends-  Mixer. Mastering.
Modern Subject- Producer. Mixer. Engineer. Keys. Percussion. Bass. Mastering.
Phil Joel- Guitars. Bgv's. Keys. Piano. Engineer. Producer. Mixer.
Driving By Braille- Vocals. Guitar. Songwriting
Lovelite- (come & live records)Producer. Engineer. Guitars. Keys. Piano. Percussion. Programming. String Arrangements.
Ladies & Gentelman- Mixer. Mastering.
EEII- Mixer.
Ryan Baxley- Engineering. Mixer
Tarmac- Mixer.
Peoplemover- Guitars. Vocals. Engineer.
The O.C. Supertones- (bec)Engineer.
Letter Kills- (island records)Engineer.
Unionvox-  Mixer.
Five Letters-  Mixer. Mastering.
The Fictions- Producer. Mixer. Engineer.
Derek Dahl- (O.C. Music Award, TV Publishing)Producer. Mixer. Engineer.
The Lads- (TBN, Lifeway TV series) composer/songwriter/producer.
Stereo Intellect- Producer. Mixer. Engineer. Keys. Piano. Gtrs. Percussion. Programming
It's Like Love- Producer. Mixer. Engineer.
Italian/Japanese- Mastering.
Paper Thin Walls- (KROQ 106.7)Co-Producer. Mixer. Engineer.
Jai Callahan- Mixer.
Stellar- Co-Producer. Engineer.
Blue Background- Producer. Mixer. Engineer.
Route of Soul- Co-Producer. Mixer. Engineer.
Danny Larsh- Co-Producer. Mixer. Engineer.
All About The Benjamins- Mastering.
Fly Denver- Mixer.
Robert Mayer- Producer. Mixer. Engineer.
Kelly Ruppe- (Northern Records) Producer. Mixer. Engineer. Guitars. Bgv's. Bass. Keys. Programming.
Crave Worship Band- Engineer.
Sas- Co-Producer. Mixer. Engineer.
The Deal- (throwdown records) Engineer.
Muse of Fire- Mixer. Engineer.
Hoodwink- Engineer. Mixer.
Soonmee Kwan- Engineer. Mixer.
Frank not so hotsa sinatra- Mixer. Engineer.
South Shores Church Band- Co-Producer. Mixer. Engineer. Guitars. Keys. Bgv's. Programming.
Uovoixn- Producer. Mixer. Engineering.Songwriter
Rami Alfara- Mixer. Engineer.
Ann Laui- Mixer. Engineer.
Midnight Swordance- Co-Producer. Mixer. Engineer.
Marin Smith- Producer. Mixer. Engineer.
South Shores Church choir and orchestra- Mixer. Engineer. Mastering.
South Coast Singers and Orchestra- Engineer.
Tori Lee- Mixer. Engineer.
Crescent Drive- Mixer. Engineer.
Bootleg- Engineer.
BOH- (O.C. Music Award winner) Mixer. Engineer.
Curt Philips- (IE Music Award winner)Mixer. Engineer. Programming. Guitars. Bgv's. Mastering.
Dead Mans Dollar- (O.C. Music Award Nominee)Co-Producer. Mixer. Engineer. Mastering.
Phinehas- Co-Producer. Mixer. Engineer. Mastering.
Nathaniel Meyst- Producer. Mixer. Engineer. Guitars. Programming. Keys. Mastering.
Stairwells- Producer. Mixer. Engineer. Guitars. String Arrangements. Keys.
Fire in Cairo- Mixer. Engineer.
Julie Downs- Producer. Mixer. Engineer. Guitars. Bass. Programming. Keys. Piano. Percussion. Noises. Arrangements

References

External links
 Official website
 Fanbolt.com
 Ocweekly.com

Year of birth missing (living people)
Living people
Record producers from California
Songwriters from California